Regius Professor of Medicine may refer to:
 Regius Professor of Medicine (Aberdeen)
 Regius Professor of Physic (Cambridge)
 Regius Professor of Physic (Dublin)
 Regius Professor of Medicine and Therapeutics (Glasgow)
 Regius Professor of Medicine (Oxford)

See also 
 Regius Professor